Orphée Neola (born 1 February 1991) is a French sprinter. She competed in the women's 100 metres at the 2017 World Championships in Athletics.

References

External links

1991 births
Living people
French female sprinters
World Athletics Championships athletes for France
People from Montfermeil
Sportspeople from Seine-Saint-Denis